Saṃsāra (transmigration) in Jain philosophy, refers to the worldly life characterized by continuous rebirths and reincarnations in various realms of existence.  is described as mundane existence, a life full of suffering and misery, and hence it is considered undesirable and worth renunciation. The Saṃsāra is without any beginning, and the soul finds itself in bondage with its karma since the beginning-less time. Moksha is the only way to be liberated from saṃsāra.

Influx of karmas (asrava)
According to the Jain text Tattvartha Sutra:

Activities that lead to the influx of karmas (asrava) which extends transmigration are:
Five senses
Four passions (kasāya)
Anger
Ego
Deceit
Greed
The non-observance of the five vows
Non-observance of the twenty-five activities like Righteousness

Saṃsāra bhavanā

Jain texts prescribe meditation on twelve forms of reflection (bhāvanā) for those who wish to stop the above described asrava. One such reflection is Saṃsāra bhavanā.
It has been described in one of the Jain text, Sarvārthasiddhi as:

Champat Rai Jain, a 20th-century Jain writer, in his book The Practical Dharma, wrote:

See also
 Jain cosmology

Notes

References
 
 
 
 

Jain philosophical concepts